Ralph Bunche House was the home Ralph Bunche commissioned from Hilyard Robinson in 1941. It is located at 1510 Jackson Street, Northeast, Washington, D.C., United States, in the Brookland neighborhood.

He lived there while he was a professor at Howard University, and worked at the State Department, from 1941 to 1947.

It was listed in the National Register of Historic Places in 1993.
It was named as an endangered place by the D.C. Preservation League in 2001.

See also
National Register of Historic Places listings in Washington, D.C.
Ralph J. Bunche House, his home in Los Angeles, California
Ralph Johnson Bunche House, the home in Queens, New York, where Bunche lived for 30 years until his death in 1971.

References

External links
hometownlocator.com
mapcarta

Houses on the National Register of Historic Places in Washington, D.C.
Houses completed in 1941
Houses in Washington, D.C.
Brookland (Washington, D.C.)